Andriy Mykolayovych Raspopov (born 25 June 1978) is a retired Ukrainian footballer who last played for Belarusian First League club Vitebsk.

External links
 
 
 

1978 births
Living people
Sportspeople from Lviv
Ukrainian footballers
Association football defenders
Ukrainian expatriate footballers
Expatriate footballers in Belarus
Expatriate footballers in Azerbaijan
MFC Mykolaiv players
FC Enerhiya Yuzhnoukrainsk players
FC Dnepr Mogilev players
FC Dinamo Minsk players
FC Karpaty Lviv players
FC Arsenal Kyiv players
FC Granit Mikashevichi players
Simurq PIK players
FC Vitebsk players